Events in the year 2018 in Somalia.

Incumbents
 President – Mohamed Abdullahi Mohamed
 Prime Minister – Hassan Ali Khaire

Events

23 February – February 2018 Mogadishu attack
1 April – 2018 African Union base attack in Bulo Marer
19 May – Cyclone Sagar makes landfall, killing 31 in Somalia

Deaths

14 May – Abdulrahim Abby Farah, diplomat and politician (b. 1919).

References

 
2010s in Somalia
Years of the 21st century in Somalia
Somalia
Somalia